Lin Cheng-sheng (born 31 March 1959) is a Taiwanese film director. His 1997 film Sweet Degeneration was entered into the 48th Berlin International Film Festival. He won the Silver Bear for Best Director for Betelnut Beauty in 2001.

Filmography

Director

Narratives 
1996: A Drifting Life (春花夢露)
1997: Murmur of Youth (美麗在唱歌)
1998: Sweet Degeneration (放浪)
1999: March of Happiness (天馬茶房)
2001: Betelnut Beauty (愛你愛我)
2003: Robinson's Crusoe (魯賓遜漂流記)
2005: The Moon Also Rises (月光下，我記得)
2013: 27°C – Loaf Rock (世界第一麥方)
TBA: The Future keeps coming and coming: goodbye to the age of solitude (literally translated from 未來一直來一直來之告別孤寂年代; in production)

Documentaries 
2008: My Ocean (海洋練習曲)
2010: Twinkle Twinkle Little Stars (一閃一閃亮晶晶)
2015: One journey, one mission (有任務的旅行)

Actor 
Tropical Fish (1995)
Buddha Bless America (1996)
Yours and Mine (1997)

References

External links

1959 births
Living people
Taiwanese film directors
Silver Bear for Best Director recipients